Driver Jamuna is a 2022 Indian Tamil-language thriller film directed by  P. Kinslin and starring Aishwarya Rajesh, Aadukalam Naren and Kavitha Bharathi in the lead roles. It was released on 30 December 2022. The film started streaming on aha from 20 January 2023.

Cast
Aishwarya Rajesh as Jamuna
Aadukalam Naren as Maragathavel 
Kavitha Bharathi
Abhishek Kumar
Ilaya Pandi
Manikandan Rajesh
Sriranjini as Jamuna's Mother
Pandian as Jamuna's father

Production
The film was officially announced in January 2021, coinciding with Aishwarya Rajesh's birthday. Touted to be a "crime thriller", production began by March 2021 with Kinslin of Vathikuchi (2013) fame, making his return as director. To incorporate their body language into her character, Aishwarya Rajesh met many taxi drivers during her research for the film.

Release
The film was theatrically released on 30 December 2022 across Tamil Nadu, alongside a Telugu dubbed version. The film started streaming on aha from 20 January 2023. While the satellite brought by Kalaignar TV.

Reception
The film opened to mixed reviews; while Aishwarya Rajesh's performance received positive reviews, the film received criticism for its writing.

A reviewer from Times of India noted "Aishwarya Rajesh tries her best to save this hastily written road thriller" adding that "Driver Jamuna has engaging moments, but it's definitely not the road movie one would willingly opt for". A reviewer from The New Indian Express noted "the Aishwarya Rajesh-starrer is all over the place all at once" adding that "the earnestness of the filmmaker's vision probably withered away due to a lack of focused writing and prosaic filmmaking techniques". The Hindustan Times wrote "for a thriller, it reserves most of its thrills for the last 10 minutes, and that’s a move that may not appeal to everybody", while India Today noted the "lacklustre film that suffers from logical loopholes".

References

External links

2022 films
2020s Tamil-language films